Suzanne Asbury-Oliver is an American and is the only active female professional skywriter in the world. Asbury-Oliver aviated for PepsiCo and now has her own skywriting company, Olivers Flying Circus. She estimates that in a typical year, she writes 500 sky messages in over 150 locations nationwide

Early life 
Asbury-Oliver was born in Forest Grove, Oregon. She began flying gliders at 14. By 15, she was flew her first solo mission.

Career 
At 18 she was a professional aviator and had already earned her powered-aircraft instrument rating, commercial certificate, flight instructor and instrument-flight instructor certificates, and a multiengine rating. She had become an aviation professional and begun skywriting for Pepsi in the 1980s.

She obtained an Airline Transport Pilot (ATP) Certification.

References 

Living people
American women aviators
American aviation businesspeople
Year of birth missing (living people)
21st-century American women